Everything Is Beautiful was Ray Stevens' sixth studio album, released in 1970, as well as his first for Barnaby Records. After making regular appearances on The Andy Williams Show during the show's eleventh season, Stevens left Monument Records in early 1970 and signed with Barnaby (which was owned by Williams).
The album was rush-released to capitalize on the success of the single of the same name, which was the album's sole single. Cover versions include "Get Together," "Raindrops Keep Fallin' on My Head," John Denver's hit "Leaving on a Jet Plane," "A Time for Us," Bob Dylan's song "She Belongs to Me," and two of the Beatles' songs ("She Came in Through the Bathroom Window" and "Something").

The back of the album cover contains a photo of Stevens and Andy Williams.

On May 17, 2005, Collectables Records re-released this album and Stevens' next album Ray Stevens...Unreal!!! together on one CD.

Track listing

Album credits
Arranged and produced by Ray Stevens for Ahab Productions, Inc.

Personnel
Piano: Ray Stevens
Bass: Norbert Putnam
Drums: Jerry Carrigan
Guitars: Jerry Kennedy, Harold Bradley, Chip Young
Percussion: Farrell Morris
Strings: Brenton Banks, Byron Back, George Binkley, Lillian Vann Hunt, Marvin Chantry, Martin Katahn, Sheldon Kurland, Bruce Waterman, Stefanie Woolf, Rex Peer, David Vanderkooi, Gary Van Osdale
Steel Guitar: Weldon Myrick
Trumpets: Patrick McGuffey, George Tidwell, Don Sheffield, Glenn Baxter
Trombones: Dennis Good, Gene Mullins
Saxophones: Billy Puett, Norman Ray
"Everything Is Beautiful," performed with the B.C.&M. Choir of Nashville through the Courtesy of Nashboro Records
Studio: Jack Clement Studio - Nashville
Background voices and special effects instruments: Ray Stevens
Special thanks to: Mrs. Eichler's 2nd grade class for the introduction to "Everything Is Beautiful"
Front cover photo: Del Hayden
Back cover photo: Keats Tyler

Charts

Singles

References

1970 albums
Ray Stevens albums
Barnaby Records albums
Albums produced by Ray Stevens
Albums arranged by Ray Stevens